Layla Young (born 29 January 1979) is an English former footballer. She most recently played as a goalkeeper for Lewes, having previously played at the top level for Fulham, Doncaster Belles and Leeds United. She also played at full international level for England.

Originally from Bewbush in Crawley, Young represented Brighton & Hove Albion while still a student at Durham University, flying home every weekend to play with Albion. She later played for the University of Kansas in the USA.

International career
Young represented England, playing once at international level. She made her senior debut in August 2000, in a 1–0 friendly defeat to France, before 50,000 spectators at Stade Vélodrome.

References

Living people
English women's footballers
England women's international footballers
Fulham L.F.C. players
Lewes F.C. Women players
Doncaster Rovers Belles L.F.C. players
Leeds United Women F.C. players
FA Women's National League players
1979 births
Expatriate women's soccer players in the United States
English expatriate women's footballers
Brighton & Hove Albion W.F.C. players
Women's association football goalkeepers
Kansas Jayhawks women's soccer players
Alumni of Durham University
Sportspeople from Crawley
Footballers from West Sussex